A Story About Love is a 1995 Norwegian romantic film directed by Aune Sand, starring Beate Halkjelsvik, Beate Charlotte Lunde, Einar Lund, Aune Sand, Siv Stubsveen and Charlotte Thiis-Evensen. The film follows different couples and their love stories around the world, in Cairo, Normandy, Oslo, and New York City.

The film was panned by critics and is considered by some to be one of the worst films ever made. The critic Harald Kolstad from Dagsavisen gave it a score of zero out of a scale from one to six, refused to acknowledge Dis as a film, and claimed to have never seen anything worse.  Despite this, it became a commercial success, with fans embracing it as being "so bad it's good". Today, it is regarded as a cult film.  Aune Sand insists that Dis is a masterpiece.

See also
 List of films considered the worst
 List of cult films

References

External links
 
 Dis at Filmweb.no (Norwegian)

1995 films
1995 romantic drama films
Films set in Egypt
Films set in France
Films set in the United States
Norwegian romantic drama films